Ben Avon ('mountain of the Avon') is a mountain in the Cairngorms of Scotland. It is a sprawling mountain with a broad summit plateau dotted with granite tors. It is classified as both a Munro and a Marilyn.

From the broad summit plateau ridges lead in almost every direction, allowing access from Glen Avon to the north, from Beinn a' Bhùird to the west and from Gleann an t-Slugain in the south. To the west of the summit lies the massive corrie, Slochd Mòr, with its rocky cliffs, and the approaches from the south and west take you close to the corrie rim. The most common ascent route is via the path in the deep glen that separates Ben Avon and Beinn a' Bhùird, or from Beinn a' Bhùird itself. The summit tor itself must be climbed in order to "bag" the mountain, though it is an easy scramble.

See also 
 List of Munro mountains
 Mountains and hills of Scotland

References

Munros
Marilyns of Scotland
Mountains and hills of the Cairngorms
Mountains and hills of Moray
Mountains and hills of Aberdeenshire
One-thousanders of Scotland